In mathematics, order dual may refer to:

 Converse relation of a partial order is sometimes called its order dual. Also called its dual order or its transpose, inverse, opposite, or converse.
 Duality (order theory), duality principle for ordered sets
 Order dual (functional analysis), set of all differences of any two positive linear functionals on an ordered vector space